A tubular pin tumbler lock, also known as a circle pin tumbler lock, radial lock, or the trademark Ace lock popularized by manufacturer Chicago Lock Company since 1933, is a variety of pin tumbler lock in which a number of pins are arranged in a circular pattern, and the corresponding key is tubular or cylindrical in shape. Most locks use between six and eight pins, although some use as few as four or as many as ten. The devices have been widely used on vending machines, elevators, public computers, and bicycle locks.

Design 
The design of a tubular lock is similar to the pin tumbler lock, in that there are several stacks of pins. The key is a cylinder shape with notches cut around the outer or (rarely) inner edge. Each of these notches depresses a single pin inside the lock to a specific height allowing the lock cylinder to turn freely.

Uses 
Tubular locks are commonly seen on bicycle locks (such as the Kryptonite lock), Kensington computer locks, elevators, and a variety of coin-operated devices such as vending machines, and coin-operated washing machines.

Tubular pin tumbler locks are often considered to be safer and more resistant to picking than standard locks. This is primarily because they are often seen on coin boxes for vending machines and coin-operated machines, such as those used in a laundromat. However, the primary reason this type of lock is used in these applications is that it can be made physically shorter than other locks.

Vulnerabilities 
Such locks can be picked by a special tubular lock pick with a minimum of effort in very little time; it is also possible to defeat them by drilling with a hole-saw drill bit. To prevent drilling, many tubular locks have a middle pin made from hardened steel or contain a ball bearing in the middle pin.

Some tubular locks, such as those used on older models of Kryptonite-brand bike locks, can be opened with the back end of a ball-point pen.

See also 
 Pin tumbler lock
 Tubular lock pick
 Wafer tumbler lock

References

Locks (security device)